Dein is a surname. Notable people with the surname include:

Dick Dein (1889–1969), Australian politician
David Dein (born 1943), former vice-chairman of Arsenal Football Club and the Football Association
Gavin Dein, the founder and CEO of Reward (company), a loyalty programme management company

See also
Dein Meister (1998), single by the synthpop band, Melotron
Dein Perry, Australian actor, dancer and choreographer best known for his work with Tap Dogs